Iltifatganj, also known as Iltifatganj Bazar is a town and a nagar panchayat in Ambedaker Nagar district in the Indian state of Uttar Pradesh. Situated at the bank of Ghaghra River. It is near about 4 km to Tanda NTPC township.

Demographics
 India census, Iltifatganj had a population of 11,339. Males constitute 52% of the population and females 48%. Iltifatganj has an average literacy rate of 55%, lower than the national average of 59.5%: male literacy is 60%, and female literacy is 49%. In Iltifatganj, 20% of the population is under 6 years of age.

References

Cities and towns in Ambedkar Nagar district